Jan "Ciężki" Tarnowski (c. 1479–1527) was a Polish nobleman (szlachcic).

Jan was castellan of Biecz and Sącz, starost of Pilzno. He had one child, Dorota Tarnowska.

1470s births
1527 deaths
15th-century Polish nobility
Jan "Ciężki"
16th-century Polish nobility